The Acting Class is a 2000 American independent film directed by and starring Jill Hennessy and Elizabeth Holder. The film's supporting cast includes many of Hennessy's former Law & Order castmates, including Chris Noth, Jerry Orbach, Benjamin Bratt and Alec Baldwin as himself.

External links

2000 films
American comedy films
Films about actors
2000 comedy films
2000s English-language films
2000s American films